Railway Express Agency (REA), founded as the American Railway Express Agency and later renamed the American Railway Express Inc., was a national package delivery service that operated in the United States from 1918 to 1975. REA arranged transport and delivery via existing railroad infrastructure, much as today's UPS or DHL companies use roads and air transport. It was created through the forced consolidation of existing services into a national near-monopoly to ensure the rapid and safe movement of parcels, money, and goods during World War I.

REA ceased operations in 1975, when its business model ceased to be viable.

Early history 
Express delivery in the early 19th century was almost all by horse, whether by stagecoach or riders. The first parcel express agency in the United States is generally considered to have been started by William Frederick Harnden (1812–1845), who in 1839 began regular trips between New York City and Boston, Massachusetts, as a courier transporting small parcels, currency and other valuables. Another, Wells Fargo & Co., was founded in 1853.  Other early express companies included Southern Express Company, Adams Express Company; and Butterfield Overland Mail.

1900 to World War II 
The express business flourished in the latter half of the 19th century, and by 1900 there were four principal parcel express companies, all of which included the rapidly advancing railways as one of their means of transport: Adams Express Company, Southern Express Company, American Express Company, and Wells Fargo. Another competitor arrived in 1913: the U.S. Post Office expanded its services to offer Parcel Post. Still, private railway express business increased steadily through the end of World War I.

During the winter of 1917, the United States suffered a severe coal shortage. On December 26, President Woodrow Wilson nationalized the railroads in order to move federal troops, their supplies, and coal. Treasury Secretary William Gibbs McAdoo was appointed Director General of the newly formed United States Railroad Administration (USRA), which controlled all significant railroads in the country temporarily starting in December 1917.

All contracts between express companies and railroads were nullified and McAdoo proposed that all existing express companies be consolidated into a single company to serve the country's needs. The result was a new company called the American Railway Express Agency, which was formed in July 1918 as a consolidation of the four major and three minor express companies.

The USRA returned the railroads to private ownership and control in March 1920.

In 1925 the English electrical engineer, Frank Ayton reckoned that with 1,800 electrical vehicles in operation, they were the biggest user of electric vehicles in the world. (They also used  4,700 gasoline-powered vehicles for long-distance work and 17,500 horses.

In March 1929, the assets and operations of American Railway Express Inc. were transferred to Railway Express Agency (REA). REA was owned by 86 railroads in proportion to the express traffic on their lines; no one railroad or group of railroads controlled the agency.  In response to customer demand, REA added a Chicago, Illinois-based refrigerator car line.  In 1927, REA began an Air Express Division. In 1938, the remainder of Southern Express also joined the consolidated REA.

Notable employees
Harry K. McClintock Who worked as an Express Handler in San Francisco from 1920 to 1922. The Big Rock Candy Mountains

Post-World War II 
Due to rate increases, express operations remained profitable into the 1950s.  REA concentrated on express refrigerator service after 1940, and continued to expand its fleet of express reefers until the mid- to late-1950s. At that time, business declined dramatically owing to competition from refrigerated motor trucks. By this time, overall rail express volume had also decreased substantially. Federal investment in the interstate highway system after WWII meant that trucks and other vehicles had more flexibility in transporting goods to a variety of cities. The increase in private ownership of automobiles doomed many passenger lines of the railroads, and industrywide restructuring took place.

In 1959, REA negotiated a new contract, allowing it to use any mode of transportation. It also acquired rights to allow continued service by truck freight after passenger trains were discontinued.  REA unsuccessfully attempted entering the piggyback and container business. Another blow came when the Civil Aeronautics Board terminated REA's exclusive agreement with the airlines for air express.

REA Express and decline 

In 1960 the company's name was changed to REA Express, Inc. By 1965 many of REA's refrigerator cars, stripped of their refrigeration equipment, were in lease service as bulk mail carriers. Many were relegated to work train service.

Generally, business was good in the 1940s. “Alas, things crumbled after World War II which coincided with a rapid decline in rail travel,” according to the America Rails website. “Express shipments had always been handled as dead-end traffic and railroads grew increasingly disinterested in subsidizing a business model losing ever-more money.”

In 1969, after several years of losses, REA was sold to five of its corporate officers.  By then its entire business constituted less than 10% of all intercity parcel traffic, and it transported only 10% of its business by rail.

Trying to find a way to survive, REA Express became embroiled in extensive litigation with the railroads and the United Parcel Service, and tried to renegotiate contracts with the Brotherhood of Railway Workers' Union. In November 1975, REA Express terminated operations and filed for bankruptcy. During the railroad strike of October 1974, the first Altair 8800 microcomputer was lost. It had been shipped from Albuquerque to Popular Electronics magazine in New York via REA and never arrived.

"With the company losing money hand over fist for years, it was now in exponential debt. On average, REA had lost $50 million a year since 1969. In November 1975, Tom Kole, REA board chairman, told the press that the recession 'has literally pulled the rug out from under our carefully planned recovery program ….' Disappearing along with 8,000 jobs was all the REA’s property, including those once familiar green trucks with the red-diamond signs, which was sold at auction."

Notable agents 
 Arthur Perdue worked as a Railway Express agent in Salisbury, Maryland.

References

Bibliography

External links 
 NRHS Archives: Railway Express Agency
 North East Rails: Railway Express Agency
 The Adams Express Company:  150 Years (corporate history largely devoted to its rail-express past)

 
Refrigerator car lines of the United States
Railway companies established in 1917
Logistics companies of the United States
Express mail
Corporations chartered by the United States Congress
United States Railroad Administration
Railway companies disestablished in 1975
Rail freight transportation in the United States